Big Cone is a geyser in the West Thumb Geyser Basin of Yellowstone National Park in the United States.

At times of increased water level in the lake, the cone may be submerged completely. Big Cone is known to undergo rare eruptions 1 foot high or less.

References

Geysers of Wyoming
Geothermal features of Teton County, Wyoming
Geothermal features of Yellowstone National Park
Geysers of Teton County, Wyoming